Roland was an unprotected cruiser of the  built for the French Navy in the 1870s, the fourth and final member of the class. The ship was laid down in 1877 and she was completed in 1884. She was deployed to East Asia during the Sino-French War in January 1885, but the conflict had ended by the time she arrived. After completing her tour in East Asian waters, she served a stint in the North Atlantic Squadron from 1890, a role she filled for much of the decade, between periods out of service in reserve. Roland was ultimately struck from the naval register in 1897 and sold for scrap the following year.

Design

The navy sought new unprotected cruisers that carried a heavier armament than earlier vessels, while maintaining a similar size to keep costs from increasing during a period of limited naval budgets. The design for the ships was drawn up by Victorin Sabattier. The vessels were intended to serve overseas in the French colonial empire.

She displaced  as designed. The ship had a ram bow and an overhanging stern. Her crew amounted to 269 officers and enlisted men. The ship's propulsion system consisted of a single compound steam engine driving a screw propeller. Steam was provided by six coal-burning fire-tube boilers that were ducted into a single funnel.

The ship was armed with a main battery of fifteen  M1870M 21.3-caliber guns. Two were placed in the forecastle, firing through embrasures as chase guns, one was atop the stern, and the remainder were placed in an amidships battery on the upper deck, six guns per broadside. Of the broadside guns, the forward three on each side were placed in sponsons, while the remaining three guns were in pivot mounts firing through embrasures. A pair of  Hotchkiss revolver cannon provided close-range defense against torpedo boats. She also carried a pair of  bronze mountain guns or a single  field gun that could be sent ashore with a landing party.

Service history

The ship, named after Rear Admiral Pierre-Nicolas Rolland (and is therefore sometimes referred to as Rolland), was launched on 14 October 1882. She was commissioned to begin sea trials on 25 March 1884, including full power testing carried out on 15 July. The ship was pronounced completed the following month, and on 1 August she was allocated to the 2nd category of reserve. She was transferred to the 3rd category of reserve on 5 November, before being commissioned on 21 January 1885 for a deployment to French Indochina in East Asia during the Sino-French War.

The ships departed Brest on 21 February and stopped in Algiers, French Algeria, on 3 March while en route. By 25 April, they had arrived on station in French Indochina, though a preliminary peace agreement had already been signed on 4 April, so the ships saw no action during the war.

At some point thereafter, Roland was laid up, before being reactivated in September 1894 to relieve Magon on the North Atlantic Squadron. She was still in service on the North American station in 1896, along with the unprotected cruiser . The following year, Roland was replaced by the unprotected cruiser . Roland was struck from the naval register on 19 May 1897 and sold at Lorient on 5 November 1898 to be broken up.

Notes

References
 
 
 
 
 
 
 
 
 
 

Villars-class cruisers
Ships built in France
1882 ships